Bolazec is a commune in the Finistère department of Brittany in northwestern France.

Population
Inhabitants of Bolazec are called in French Bolazécois.

See also
Communes of the Finistère department
Parc naturel régional d'Armorique

References

Mayors of Finistère Association  ;

Communes of Finistère